The Bundesstraße 245 (abbreviated B 245) is a German federal highway in Saxony-Anhalt. It runs from Haldensleben in Börde to Halberstadt in Harz.

Route / Junctions

See also 
 List of federal highways in Germany

245
Roads in Saxony-Anhalt